Émile Michelet (born 16 July 1867, date of death unknown) was a French sailor who represented his country at the 1900 Summer Olympics in Meulan, France. With crewmember Marcel Meran, Michelet, as helmsman, took the 3rd place in the race of the 0.5 to 1 ton.

Further reading

References

External links
 
 

1867 births
French male sailors (sport)
Sailors at the 1900 Summer Olympics – .5 to 1 ton
Sailors at the 1900 Summer Olympics – Open class
Olympic sailors of France
Year of death missing
Olympic silver medalists for France
Olympic bronze medalists for France
Olympic medalists in sailing
Sportspeople from Paris
Medalists at the 1900 Summer Olympics
Sailors at the 1900 Summer Olympics – 3 to 10 ton
Place of death missing